The Southern Skies Quattro is an American paramotor that was designed and produced by Southern Skies of Taylorsville, North Carolina for powered paragliding.

Design and development
The aircraft was designed to comply with the US FAR 103 Ultralight Vehicles rules and was the first paramotor to use a four-stroke powerplant. It features a paraglider-style high-wing, single-place accommodation and a single computer-controlled, electronic ignition system-equipped, Honda Kart engine, without a reduction drive, mounted in pusher configuration. As is the case with all paramotors, take-off and landing is accomplished by foot.

Specifications (Quattro)

References

1990s United States ultralight aircraft
Single-engined pusher aircraft
Paramotors